Fleischmann Mountain is a mountain located in the Catskill Mountains of New York east of Arkville. Hog Mountain is located north of Fleischmann Mountain and Meade Hill is located west.

References

Mountains of Delaware County, New York
Mountains of New York (state)